The William Joseph McInnes Botanic Garden and Campus Arboretum is located at the corner of Seminary Avenue and MacArthur Boulevard on the campus of Mills College in Oakland, California, United States.

See also
 List of botanical gardens in the United States

External links
 Mills Website - Botanic Garden page

Botanical gardens in California
Arboreta in California
Tourist attractions in Oakland, California
Parks in Oakland, California